Vaishya (Sanskrit: वैश्य, vaiśya) is one of the four varnas of the Hindu social order in ancient India. Vaishyas are classed third in the order of caste hierarchy. 

The occupation of Vaishyas consists mainly of agriculture, taking care of cattle, trade and other business pursuits.

Traditional duties

Hindu religious texts assigned Vaishyas to traditional roles in agriculture and cattle-rearing, but over time they came to be landowners, traders and money-lenders. Therefore making it their responsibility to provide sustenance for those of higher class, since they were of lower class. The Vaishyas, along with members of the Brahmin and Kshatriya varnas, claim dvija status ("twice born", a second or spiritual birth) after sacrament of initiation as in Hindu theology. Indian traders were widely credited for the spread of Indian culture to regions as far as southeast Asia.

Historically, Vaishyas have been involved in roles other than their traditional pastoralism, trade and commerce. According to historian Ram Sharan Sharma, the Gupta Empire was a Vaishya dynasty that "may have appeared as a reaction against oppressive rulers".

Vaishyas are usually vegetarian due to the concept of ahimsa.

See also 

 Bania (caste)

References

External links
 
 All India Vaish Federation

 
Varnas in Hinduism